Syarhey Krot (born 27 June 1980) is a Belarusian professional footballer. As of 2022, he plays for and coaches FC Ostrovets as a player-manager.

Honours
Shakhtyor Soligorsk
Belarusian Premier League champion: 2005

Al-Ahed
Lebanese Premier League champion: 2010–11

References

External links

1980 births
Living people
Belarusian footballers
Association football forwards
Belarusian expatriate footballers
Expatriate footballers in Uzbekistan
Expatriate footballers in Lebanon
Expatriate footballers in Latvia
Belarusian Premier League players
FC Osipovichi players
FC Darida Minsk Raion players
FC Smorgon players
FC BATE Borisov players
FC SKVICH Minsk players
FC Shakhtyor Soligorsk players
FC Nasaf players
FC Slutsk players
FC Gorodeya players
Al Ahed FC players
BFC Daugavpils players
FC Baranovichi players
FC Molodechno players
FC Ostrovets players
Belarusian expatriate sportspeople in Lebanon
Lebanese Premier League players
Belarusian football managers